According to al-Shabab, Burundian troops began indiscriminately shelling the rebel controlled district of Dayniile, located north of Mogadishu, with mortars and rockets whereby dozens of civilians died.

The Battle
Shortly after the shelling stopped, the Burundian army began to move in towards the district of Dayniile. Al-Shabab became aware of the army's movements when they were informed by reconnaissance teams, which gave them enough time to prepare for a possible ground assault. When Burundian troops moved in along their tanks and armored personnel carriers, they fell into an ambush by al-Shabab militants where fighting lasted for six full hours, until the military offensive was repulsed. One witness recalled counted the bodies of 63 Burundian soldiers, all of whom were dead with bullet shots to the head or shoulders, and brought by trucks from Dayniile. No Somalian soldiers were reported killed during the battle, with all the dead coming from Burundian forces.

Aftermath
In all, during the initial battle al-Shabab claimed they have killed 150 Burundian soldiers but only have the bodies of 76 in their custody, the largest casualty loss for African forces in Somalia. According to the AU the claim was dismissed of the displayed row of dead soldiers bodies claiming to be AU troops, saying al-Shabab was trying to spread propaganda and in reality only 10 Burundian soldiers were killed and two went missing in the battle.

References

Deynile
2011 in Somalia
Conflicts in 2011
October 2011 events in Africa
Deynile
Burundi–Somalia military relations
Battles in 2011